Víctor Blanco may refer to:

 Víctor Blanco (governor), Mexican official and politician
 Víctor Manuel Blanco (1918–2011), Puerto Rican astronomer